Albert Tetteh Nyakotey (born 10 August 1965) is a Ghanaian politician who is a member of the National Democratic Congress. He is the member of parliament for the Yilo Krobo  constituency in the Eastern Region of Ghana.

Early life and education 
Tetteh hails from Somanya, a town in the Eastern Region. He holds a Commonwealth Executive MBA in Management.

References 

Living people
Ghanaian MPs 2021–2025
1965 births
National Democratic Congress (Ghana) politicians